Distinguished from the Late Permian junior synonym of Akidnognathus "Hofmeyria".

Hofmeyria is an extinct genus of therocephalians.

See also

 List of therapsids

References

Eutherocephalians
Prehistoric synapsids of Africa
Fossil taxa described in 1935
Taxa named by Robert Broom
Therocephalia genera